Petras Šiurskas (born 11 August 1953) is a Lithuanian Soviet sprint canoer who competed in the mid to late 1970s. He won two medals in the K-2 10000 m event at the ICF Canoe Sprint World Championships with a gold in 1977 and a bronze in 1975.

References

Living people
Soviet male canoeists
Lithuanian male canoeists
1953 births
ICF Canoe Sprint World Championships medalists in kayak